Phthersigena unicornis is a species of praying mantis native to Australia.

See also
List of mantis genera and species
Unicorn mantis

References

Mantidae
Insects of Timor
Insects described in 1923